Brogdon is a surname. Notable people with the surname include:

Alastair Brogdon (born 1987), English field hockey player
Cindy Brogdon (born 1957), American women's basketball player
Connor Brogdon (born 1995), American baseball player
Malcolm Brogdon (born 1992), American basketball player
Randy Brogdon (born 1953), American businessman and politician
Given names